Duckow is a village and a former municipality in the Mecklenburgische Seenplatte district, in Mecklenburg-Vorpommern, Germany. Since January 2019, it is part of the municipality Malchin.

References

Former municipalities in Mecklenburg-Western Pomerania